Mira J. Spektor (November 8, 1928 – November 28, 2021) was a German-born American composer, poet, and music director. She was the founder of the Atlantic Opera Singers and the Aviva Players.

Biography
Spektor was born in Berlin in 1928 and her parents were Lithuanians that escaped the pogroms.

She wrote her first musical while she was in high school and also sang in it. Spektor attended Sarah Lawrence College, Mannes School of Music, and Juilliard School, later performing in Off-Broadway plays and recording songs for LPs and CDs. The Atlantic Opera Singers was started by Spektor and lasted for 10 years.

In 1975, Spektor started The Aviva Players, a chamber music group that performed music by women composers starting from the 12th century. Record labels that released her music include Original Cast Records and Airplay. She wrote a feminist musical titled The Housewives' Cantata, which had a playbook published in 1994 by Georgina Press. She also wrote a collection of poems titled The Road to November. Her music has been played in films and television shows.

References

1928 births
2021 deaths
Sarah Lawrence College alumni
Jewish American composers
Jewish American poets
Musicians from Berlin
Writers from Berlin
Jewish emigrants from Nazi Germany to the United States
American people of Lithuanian-Jewish descent
20th-century American composers
20th-century American poets
20th-century American women writers
20th-century American women musicians
Mannes School of Music alumni
Juilliard School alumni
21st-century American composers
21st-century American poets
21st-century American women writers
21st-century American women musicians
20th-century women composers
21st-century women composers
21st-century American Jews